Leighton Edward Buckwell (November 28, 1918 – January 2, 1997) was a provincial level politician from Alberta, Canada. He served as a member of the Legislative Assembly of Alberta from 1967 to 1975 sitting with the Social Credit caucus in government and opposition.

Political career
Buckwell ran for a seat to the Alberta Legislature in the 1967 Alberta general election. He won the electoral district of Macloed defeating three other candidates by a comfortable margin to hold the district for the Social Credit party.

He ran for a second term in office in the 1971 Alberta general election. Buckwell increased his popular vote to be returned to his district. He faced a tough fight in the three-way race from Progressive Conservative candidate Danny Le Grandeur who finished a close second.

The Social Credit party lost government and formed the official opposition after 1971. Buckwell ran for a third term in office in the 1975 Alberta general election facing a four cornered battle. He lost some of his popular vote and was defeated by Progressive Conservative candidate Thomas Walker to finish second.

Buckwell died on January 2, 1997.

References

External links
Legislative Assembly of Alberta Members Listing

Alberta Social Credit Party MLAs
1918 births
1997 deaths